Kellswater is a hamlet near to the village of Kells in Northern Ireland. The name of the hamlet comes from the nearby Kells Water.

Transport
Kellswater railway station opened on 1 June 1876 and finally closed on 15 March 1971.  One of the platforms of this station can't  be seen from passing trains.

References

Villages in County Antrim